The Zharchikhinski mine is one of the largest molybdenum mines in Russia. The mine is located near Ulan-Ude in south-east Russia in Buryatia. The Zharchikhinski mine has reserves amounting to 110 million tonnes of molybdenum ore grading 0.09% molybdenum thus resulting 100,000 tonnes of molybdenum.

See also
List of molybdenum mines

References 

Molybdenum mines in Russia